Kosmos 605, or Bion 1, was a Bion satellite. Kosmos 605 was the first of eleven Bion satellites.

Launch 
Kosmos 605 was launched by a Soyuz-U rocket flying from Site 43/3 at the Plesetsk Cosmodrome in the Soviet Union.

Mission 
The spacecraft orbited the Earth for 21 days until its biological capsule returned to Earth on 22 November 1973 in a region of northwestern Kazakhstan. It carried several dozen male rats (possibly 25  or 45 ), six Russian tortoises (Agrionemys horsfieldii)  (each in a separate box), a mushroom bed, flour beetles (Tribolium confusum) in various stages of their life cycle, and living bacterial spores. It provided data on the reaction of mammal, reptile, insect, fungal, and bacterial forms to prolonged weightlessness.

Results 
After returning, the animals found several functional changes, such as decreased body temperature, difficulty breathing, muscle atrophy, decreased bone mechanical strength and decreased mass of some internal organs and glands. No pathological changes were found. 3–4 weeks after landing, most of these changes receded and the animals returned to normal. In the experiment, for the first time, a second generation of insects was obtained whose weightlessness was developed. No differences were detected between the second and the first generation. The influence of space conditions on the development of fungi was also found. Growing up in a weightless state, they created a very thin and extremely bent leg and a more massive mycelium than on Earth. Kosmos 605 also tested means of protection against ionizing radiation.

See also 

 1973 in spaceflight

References

Bibliography 
 Kozlov, D. I. (1996), Mashnostroenie, ed.; Konstruirovanie avtomaticheskikh kosmicheskikh apparatov, Moscow, ISBN
 Melnik, T. G. (1997), Nauka, ed.; Voenno-Kosmicheskiy Sili, Moscow, ISBN
 "Bion' nuzhen lyudyam", Novosti Kosmonavtiki, (6): 35, 1996

Bion satellites
Kosmos satellites
Spacecraft launched in 1973
1973 in spaceflight
1973 in the Soviet Union